BBRG may refer to:

Bravo Brio Restaurant Group, a Columbus, Ohio restaurant mangament company operating Bravo!, Cucina Italiana and Brio restaurants
Black-n-Bluegrass RollerGirls, a roller derby team